The Salmon Preservation Act 1285 (13 Edw 1 c 47) was an Act of the Parliament of England. It was chapter 47 of the Statute of Westminster the Second.

The Act prohibited the taking of salmon from English rivers between the 8th September and 11 November and forbade the taking of young salmon by nets or any other engine from the midst of April to the 24th June. The Act stipulated that any found in contravention of such regulations would, on the first offence, have their nets and equipment burnt, on the second, be subject to imprisonment for a quarter of a year, on the third, be held in prison for a whole year.

The Act was reissued and confirmed in the 13th year of Richard II in 1389 with a clause altering the prohibited fishing dates for rivers within the County of Lancaster from 29 September to 2 February.

References